Baden (an obsolete German word for "Baths") is the western part of the German state of Baden-Württemberg, named for Baden-Baden, which was named for its hot springs.

Baden may also refer to:

Places

Australia
 Baden, Tasmania, a locality in Tasmania

Austria 
 Baden, Austria, also known as "Baden bei Wien" (Baden near Vienna)
 Baden District, Austria, a district of the state of Lower Austria in Austria

Canada 
 Baden, Ontario

France 
 Baden, Morbihan

Germany 
 Baden-Baden, officially named "Baden" until 1931, a town located in the Black Forest, Baden-Württemberg, Germany
 Baden, Lower Saxony, a village near Bremen
 Margraviate of Baden, its subdivisions and successor states:
 Margraviate of Baden (1112–1803), a historical territory of the Holy Roman Empire along the east side of the Upper Rhine River in southwestern Germany
 Margraviate of Baden-Baden
 Margraviate of Baden-Durlach
 Margraviate of Baden-Hachberg
 Margraviate of Baden-Rodemachern
 Electorate of Baden (1803–1806)
 Grand Duchy of Baden (1806–1918)
 Republic of Baden (1918–1945), part of the Weimar Republic and Nazi Germany
 Land Baden (1945–1952), the southern half of the former Republic of Baden, a subdivision of the French occupation zone of post-World War II Germany, after the previous states of Baden and Württemberg had been split up between the US and French occupation zones
 Württemberg-Baden (1945–1952), a subdivision of the US occupation zone of post-World War II Germany
 Baden-Württemberg, a federal state in modern Germany since 1952

Switzerland 
 Baden, Switzerland, a town in Switzerland, also unofficially known as "Baden bei Zürich" (Baden near Zürich) or "Baden in Aargau"
 County of Baden, a condominium (1415–1798) of the Old Swiss Confederacy
 Canton of Baden, canton of the Helvetic Republic (1798–1803)
 Baden District, Switzerland, a district in the canton of Aargau, Switzerland

Ukraine 
 Baden, Ukraine, a village in the Rozdilnianskyi Raion near Odessa

United States 
 Baden, Maryland, a census-designated place in Prince George's County
 Baden, Pennsylvania, a borough in Beaver County
 Baden, St. Louis, Missouri, a neighborhood
 Baden, the original name of South San Francisco, California

People 
 Baden Powell (guitarist), Brazilian bossa nova guitarist
 Charlotte Baden, Danish writer
 Fred Baden, American politician; see Louisiana Political Museum and Hall of Fame
 Michael Baden, forensic pathologist and professional witness
 Robert Baden-Powell, 1st Baron Baden-Powell, founder of Scouting

Ships 
 , a Sachsen-class of the German Imperial Navy
 , a Bayern-class of the German Imperial Navy during World War I
 , a fishing trawler in service 1934-39, served as the vorpostenboote V 214 Baden and V 404 Baden during World War II

Other 
 Baden culture, an archaeological culture of the late Eneolithic
 Baden School, Baden School of Neo-Kantians (also known as Southwest School)
 Treaty of Baden (1714), ending conflict between France and the Holy Roman Empire and the last treaty ending the War of the Spanish Succession
 Treaty of Baden (1718), ending conflicts among several Swiss cantons

See also
 
 Baden Baden (disambiguation)
 Bath (disambiguation), the equivalent English placename
 Caspar A. Baaden (died 1918), New York politician